Tolparovo (Talpar) is a rural locality (a village) in Tolparovsky Selsoviet, Gafuriysky District, Bashkortostan, Russia. The population was 236 as of 2010. There are 7 streets.

Geography 
Tolparovo is located 57 km northeast of Krasnousolsky (the district's administrative centre) by road. Mendim is the nearest rural locality.

References 

Rural localities in Gafuriysky District